Ingo Plag (born 2 August 1962) is a German linguist and Professor of English Language and Linguistics at the Heinrich-Heine-Universität, Düsseldorf. In 2015 he and co-authors Laurie Bauer and Rochelle Lieber were the recipients of the Linguistic Society of America's Leonard Bloomfield Book Award for their 2013 work, The Oxford Reference Guide to English Morphology.
He is a co-editor of Morphology.

References

Linguists from Germany
Living people
1962 births
Morphologists
Academic staff of Heinrich Heine University Düsseldorf